Rana Bahadur Shah, King of Nepal (1775–1806) was the King of Nepal from 1777 to 1799. In 1777, he succeeded to the throne after the death of his father, King Pratap Singh Shah. He ruled under the regencies of his mother, Queen Rajendra Rajya Lakshmi Devi (died on 13 July 1785 from tuberculosis), and then of his uncle, Bahadur Shah. During this time, the kingdom expanded by conquest to include the Garhwal and Kumaon regions, now part of India. He imprisoned his uncle, Bahadur Shah, who died in jail.

Reign
The premature death of Pratap Singh Shah (reigned 1775–77), the eldest son of Prithvi Narayan Shah, left a huge power vacuum that remained unfilled for decades, seriously debilitating the emerging Nepalese state. Pratap Singh Shah's successor was his son, Rana Bahadur Shah (reigned 1777–99), aged two and one-half years at his accession. The acting regent until 1785 was Queen Rajendralakshmi, followed by Bahadur Shah (reigned 1785–94), the second son of Prithvi Narayan Shah. Court life was consumed by rivalry centered on alignments with these two regents rather than on issues of national administration, and it set a bad precedent for future competition among contending regents. The exigencies of Sino-Nepalese War in 1788–92 had forced Bahadur Shah to temporarily take a pro-British stance, which had led to a commercial treaty with the British in 1792.

Meanwhile, Rana Bahadur's youth had been spent in pampered luxury. In 1794 King Rana Bahadur Shah came of age, and his first act was to re-constitute the government such that his uncle, Bahadur Shah, had no official part to play. In mid 1795, he became infatuated with a Maithili Brahman widow, Kantavati Jha, and married her on the oath of making their illegitimate half-caste son (as per the Hindu law of that time) the heir apparent, by excluding the legitimate heir from his previous marriage. By 1797, his relationship with his uncle, who was living a retired life, and who wanted to seek refuge in China on the pretext of meeting the new emperor, had deteriorated to the extent that he ordered his imprisonment (on 19 February 1797) and his subsequent murder (on 23 June 1797). Such acts earned Rana Bahadur notoriety both among courtiers and common people, especially among Brahmins. Being ranodatta was the eldest son but not made king of Nepal

That same year in 1797, Girvan Yuddha Bikram Shah was born and was immediately declared the crown prince. However, within a year of Girvan's birth, Kantavati contracted tuberculosis; and it was advised by physicians that she perform ascetic penances to cure herself. To make sure that Girvan succeeded to the throne while Kantavati was still alive, Rana Bahadur, aged just 23, abdicated in favor of their son on 23 March 1799, placing his first wife, Raj Rajeshwari, as the regent. He joined his ailing wife, Kantavati, with his second wife, Subarnaprabha, in ascetic life and started to live in Deopatan, donning saffron robes and titling himself Swami Nirgunanda. This move was also supported by all the courtiers who were discontented of his wanton and capricious behavior. It was around this time that both Bhimsen Thapa and his father Amar Singh Thapa (sanu) were promoted from subedar to the rank of sardar, and Bhimsen began to serve as the ex-King's chief bodyguard. However, Rana Bahadur's renunciation lasted only a few months. After the inevitable death of Kantavati, Rana Bahadur suffered a mental breakdown during which he lashed out by desecrating temples and cruelly punishing the attendant physicians and astrologers. He then renounced his ascetic life and attempted to re-assert his royal authority. This led to a direct conflict with almost all the courtiers who had pledged a holy oath of allegiance to the legitimate King Girvan; this conflict eventually led to the establishment of a dual government and to an imminent civil war, with Damodar Pande leading the military force against the dissenting ex-King and his group. Since most of the military officers had sided with the courtiers, Rana Bahadur realized that his authority could not be re-established; and he was forced to flee to the British-controlled city of Varanasi in May, 1800.

Exile in Varanasi: 1800–1804

As Rana Bahadur Shah's best friend and advisor, Bhimsen Thapa also accompanied him to Varanasi. Rana Bahadur's retinue included his first wife, Rajrajeswori, while his second wife, Subarnaprabha, stayed back in Kathmandu to serve as the regent. Since Rana Bahadur was willing to do anything to regain his power and punish those who had forced him to exile, he served as a focal point of dissidenting factions in Varanasi. He first sought help from the British in exchange for which he was willing to concede a trading post in Kathmandu and grant them certain percentage of the tax revenue. However, the British were in favor of working with the existing government in Nepal, rather than risk the uncertainties of restoring an exiled ex-King to power. The Kathmandu Durbar was willing to appease the British and agreed to sign a commercial treaty so long as the wayward Rana Bahadur and his group were held in India under strict British surveillance. This arrangement was kept a secret from Rana Bahadur and his group; but when they eventually became aware of the strictures on their movement, and hence the treaty, they were incensed at the British as well as the proponents (Damodar Pande and his faction) of this treaty in Nepal. An elaborate intrigue was set in motion with the aim of splitting the unity of courtiers in Kathmandu Durbar and fomenting anti-British feelings. A flurry of letters were exchanged between the ex-King and individual courtiers in which he tried to set them up against Damodar Pande and tried to woo them by promises of high government positions, which they could hold for their entire life, and which could be inherited by their progeny.

Meanwhile, Rajrajeshowri, fed up of her debauch husband, left Varanasi, entered the border of Nepal on 26 July 1801, and taking advantage of the weak regency, was slowly making her way towards Kathmandu with the view of taking over the regency.  Back in Kathmandu the court politics turned complicated when Mul Kaji (or chief minister) Kirtiman Singh Basnet, a favorite of the Regent Subarnaprabha, was secretly assassinated on 28 September 1801, by the supporters of Rajrajeswori. In the resulting confusion many courtiers were jailed, while some executed, based solely on rumors. Bakhatbar Singh Basnet, brother of assassinated Kirtiman Singh, was then given the post of mul kaji During his tenure as the mul kaji, on 28 October 1801, a Treaty of Commerce and Alliance was finally signed between Nepal and East India Company that led to the establishment of the first British Resident, Captain William O. Knox, who was reluctantly welcomed by the courtiers in Kathmandu on 16 April 1802. The primary objective of Knox's mission was to bring the trade treaty of 1792 into full effect and to establish a "controlling influence" in Nepali politics. Almost eight months after the establishment of the Residency, Rajrajeshowri finally managed to assume the regency on 17 December 1802.

Return to Kathmandu

After Rajrajeshowri took over the regency, she was pressured by Knox to pay the annual pension of 82,000 rupees to the ex-King as per the obligations of the treaty, which paid off the vast debt that Rana Bahadur Shah had accumulated in Varanasi due to his spendthrift habits. The Nepalese court also felt it prudent to keep Rana Bahadur in isolation in Nepal itself, rather than in the British controlled India, and that paying off Rana Bahadur's debts could facilitate his return at an opportune moment. Rajrajeshowri's presence in Kathmandu also stirred unrest among the courtiers that aligned themselves around her and Subarnaprabha. Sensing an imminent hostility, Knox aligned himself with Subarnaprabha and attempted to interfere with the internal politics of Nepal. Getting a wind of this matter, Rajrajeshowri dissolved the government and elected new ministers, with Damodar Pande as the mul kaji, while the Resident Knox, finding himself persona non grata and the objectives of his mission frustrated, voluntarily left Kathmandu to reside in Makwanpur citing a cholera epidemic. Subarnaprabha and the members of her faction were arrested.

Such open display of anti-British feelings and humiliation prompted the Governor General of the time Richard Wellesley to recall Knox to India and unilaterally suspend the diplomatic ties. The Treaty of 1801 was also unilaterally annulled by the British on 24 January 1804. The suspension of diplomatic ties also gave the Governor General a pretext to allow the ex-King Rana Bahadur to return to Nepal unconditionally.

As soon as they received the news, Rana Bahadur and his group proceeded towards Kathmandu. Some troops were sent by Kathmandu Durbar to check their progress, but the troops changed their allegiance when they came face to face with the ex-King. Damodar Pande and his men were arrested at Thankot where they were waiting to greet the ex-King with state honors and take him into isolation. After Rana Bahadur's reinstatement to power, he started to extract vengeance on those who had tried to keep him in exile.

On April 25, 1806, he was beheaded by his half-brother, Sher Bahadur Shah. Rana Bahadur's death was followed by the Bhandarkhal massacre.

See also
Nepali Mandir
Pratap Singh Shah
Girvan Yuddha Bikram Shah

Notes

References

Bibliography

External links
 Royal Court of Nepal – Official Site
 Rana Bahadur Shah biography – Nepal Home Page

|-

1775 births
1806 deaths
Nepalese monarchs
Child monarchs from Asia
Nepalese Hindus
Hindu monarchs
18th-century monarchs in Asia
Rana
Mukhtiyars
People of the Nepalese unification
People from Kathmandu District
Monarchs who abdicated